Carmen for Cool Ones is a 1958 album by jazz singer Carmen McRae, arranged and directed by cellist Fred Katz.

Reception

Allmusic awarded the album four stars and reviewer Ken Dryden wrote that McRae was on "great form" on the album and particularly praised "All the Things You Are", "What's New?" and a "particularly dark version" of "The Night We Called It a Day".

Track listing
 "All the Things You Are" (Oscar Hammerstein II, Jerome Kern) - 2:26
 "A Shoulder to Cry On" (Chuck Darwin, Paulette Girard) - 3:53
 "Any Old Time" (Artie Shaw) - 3:10
 "Weak for the Man" (Jeanne Burns) - 4:08
 "What's New?" (Johnny Burke, Bob Haggart) - 2:29
 "I Get a Kick Out of You" (Cole Porter) - 2:15
 "What Can I Say After I Say I'm Sorry?" (Walter Donaldson, Abe Lyman) - 1:47
 "Without a Word of Warning" (Mack Gordon, Harry Revel) - 3:20
 "You Are Mine" (Ted Snyder, Sam Lewis, Joe Young) - 1:55
 "If I Were a Bell" (Frank Loesser) - 3:27
 "The Night We Called It a Day" (Tom Adair, Matt Dennis) - 4:27
 "I Remember Clifford" (Benny Golson, Jon Hendricks) - 2:58

Personnel
Carmen McRae - vocals
Fred Katz - arranger, conductor, cello
Ike Isaacs - double bass (except track 6)
Specs Wright - drums (exc. track 6)

on tracks 1, 7, 10
Harry Klee - flute solo
George W. Smith - clarinet
Justin Gordon, Mahlon Clark - bass clarinet

on tracks 2, 4, 9 and 12
Buddy Collette - flute, alto saxophone
George W. Smith - clarinet
Justin Gordon - bass clarinet
Warren Webb - oboe
Joe Marino - piano
Joseph R. Gibbons - guitar
Thirteen unknown string players

on tracks 3, 5, 8 and 11
Joe Marino, John T. Williams - piano, celeste
Larry Bunker, Frank Flynn - vibraphone, marimba

on track 6
Pete Candoli, Ray Linn - trumpet
Vincent DeRosa - French horn
Bob Enevoldsen, Milt Bernhart - trombone
Tommy Johnson - tuba
Calvin Jackson - piano
Billy Bean - guitar
Red Mitchell - double bass
Larry Bunker - drums

References

1958 albums
Carmen McRae albums
Decca Records albums